Renu Soundar (born: October 13, 1992) is an Indian actress who appears in Malayalam films and television series. She made her debut in the Malayalam film Manhole (2016 film) (2016). Her notable works include Chalakkudikkaran Changathi (2018), Ottam (2019) and Marjara - Oru Kalluvacha Nuna (2020)

Early life 
She studied at GHSS, Thiruvananthapuram and later moved to Kochi for completing her higher studies. Renu has a bachelor's degree in the fine arts and master of fine arts from Sree Sankaracharya University of Sanskrit.

Career 
Renu made her acting debut as the lead in the 2016 film Manhole directed by Vidhu Vincent. Manhole was also screened at the Indian Film Festival of Melbourne in 2017.

In 2018, Renu starred in the film Chalakkudikkaran Changathi along with Senthil Krishna, Honey Rose, Joju George and others. The film was a loosely based on the life of actor Kalabhavan Mani. In 2019, she had two releases, Ottam and Pengalila. Renu starred in the film Marjara - Oru kalluvacha Nunnu which released in 2020. Renu has done a film in Tamil, Manja Satta Pacha Satta (2021) along with Guru Somasundaram which is under production.

Filmography 

All films are in Malayalam language unless otherwise noted.

Television Serials

References

External links 

 

Living people
Actresses in Malayalam cinema
Indian film actresses
Actresses from Thiruvananthapuram
21st-century Indian actresses
Actresses in Malayalam television
Actresses in Tamil television
Actresses in Tamil cinema
1992 births